Chinese Indian or Indian Chinese may refer to:
 Chinese community in India
 Indians in China
 Chindians, people of mixed Indian and Chinese descent
 Indian Chinese cuisine, adaptation of Chinese seasoning and cooking techniques to Indian tastes

See also
 Indo-Chinese (disambiguation)
 Sino-Indian skirmish (disambiguation)
Other South Asian communities in China:
Nepalis in China
Pakistanis in China